Sharon Rosenfeld (born in Makati, Philippines), better known by her screen name Nikka Valencia, is a Filipino film, television and theater actress.

Early life
Valencia was born to a Filipino mother from Mindanao and a father from Haifa, Israel. She is of patrilineal Jewish descent.

Career 
Valencia's first television appearance was in ABS-CBN's Ang TV in 1993. That same year, she played the sister of Aga Muhlach's character in May Minamahal.

In 1995, Valencia became one of the original hosts of the noontime musical variety program ASAP. She appeared in films such as Pare Ko with Mark Anthony Fernandez, Jomari Yllana and Claudine Barretto, Mangarap Ka with Claudine Barretto, Mark Anthony Fernandez, Kier Legaspi and Gio Alvarez, both in 1995, and in Radio Romance starring Gelli de Belen, Jolina Magdangal and Rico Yan in 1996.

In 2012, Valencia portrayed Lorena Alvarez in Precious Hearts Romances Presents: Pintada.

Filmography

Television

Film

References

External links 
 
 
 

Living people
Star Magic
People from Makati
Actresses from Metro Manila
Year of birth missing (living people)
Filipino people of Jewish descent
Filipino people of Israeli descent